O 24, laid down K XXIV was an  of the Royal Netherlands Navy that saw service during World War II. The most famous occupant of O-24 was Piet de Jong, who was the commanding officer from 1944 until 1946 and who later became Minister of Defence in 1963 and served as Prime Minister of the Netherlands from 1967 until 1971.

Ship history
The submarine was laid down on 12 November 1937 as K XXIV at the Rotterdamsche Droogdok Maatschappij (RDM) shipyard in Rotterdam. During construction she was renamed O 24, and was finally launched on 18 March 1940. Following the German invasion of 10 May 1940, O 24 was hastily commissioned, still incomplete, and sailed for England on 13 May, to be finally completed at the Thornycroft shipyard at Southampton.

From September 1940 she was attached to the 9th Submarine Flotilla at Dundee for patrols in the North Sea and off the Norwegian coast. In March 1941 she joined the 8th Submarine Flotilla at Gibraltar for operations in the Bay of Biscay and Atlantic Ocean, and convoy patrol duties. She also operated off the east coast of Italy, sinking several ships.

In July 1942 O 24 was transferred to the British Eastern Fleet based at Colombo in Ceylon for operations in the Indian Ocean. Her patrols took her into the Strait of Malacca, off Sumatra, and around the Andaman Islands, attacking Japanese shipping and also landing small groups of British special forces on various islands. In mid-1944 she was refitted at the Philadelphia Navy Yard, then sailed for Fremantle, Australia, for further operations in the East Indies. After the Japanese surrender she was based at Batavia, before finally returning to the Netherlands in April 1946.

O 24 was reduced to the status of training ship in 1947, and was decommissioned in June 1955 to serve as a floating battery until 1958, then as an instruction vessel until 1962 when she was struck, and sold for scrapping the following year.

Victories
Ships sunk by O 24.

References

1940 ships
Ships built in Rotterdam
World War II submarines of the Netherlands
O 21-class submarines
Submarines built by Rotterdamsche Droogdok Maatschappij